The Fulton County Street Railroad Company of Atlanta, Georgia was organized in 1883 by:

 James W. English, businessman and once mayor of Atlanta
 J. Henry Porter, who was once a city councilman
 William T. Newman, Confederate war hero, U.S. district judge and city attorney; father of writer Frances Newman
 William A. Hemphill, who was once mayor
 Dr. Henry Lumpkin Wilson, physician and city councilman who was active in the city's expansion and development
 Maj. William D. Luckie, "prominent secret order man" and cashier of the Merchant's Bank
 Robert A. Bacon, secretary of the railroad commission
 David C. Black, and 
 Augustus Shaw, "well-known railroad man and veteran of the Confederacy"

The first lines authorized were to go from the Union Station to what is now Midtown Atlanta along West Peachtree St. and Jackson St.

The primary route became the Nine-Mile Circle which was intended to develop the newly subdivided neighborhood of Copenhill, where the Carter Center now stands.

It was merged into the Atlanta Consolidated Street Railway in 1891.

In 1988, the trolley barns were torn down despite the City Council and Virginia Highland Civic Associations's attempts to save them. Although previously assuring local residents that he avowed saving the historic structures, Mayor Andrew Young then vetoed the resolution, and the Council's vote of 11–3 was not enough to override it. Young cited the discovery of asbestos in the buildings and other hazardous materials on the property.

References

See also
Streetcars in Atlanta
Timeline of mass transit in Atlanta

History of Atlanta
Defunct public transport operators in the United States
Companies based in Atlanta
Railway lines in Atlanta
1883 establishments in Georgia (U.S. state)